The Scotch Whisky Act 1988 was an Act to the Parliament of the United Kingdom, passed during the reign of Queen Elizabeth II on 28 June 1988, with the long title "An Act to make provision as to the definition of Scotch whisky and as to the production and sale of whisky; and for connected purposes.".

The act first set out a definition for Scotch whisky – "whisky (distilled and matured in Scotland) as conforms to a definition of Scotch whisky contained in an order made under this subsection by the Ministers".

It also made it illegal to sell whisky as "Scotch whisky" if it does not conform to the definitions laid out in the Act, or sell whisky with an alcoholic strength of more than 94.8%.

The Act was repealed in its entirety by the Scotch Whisky Regulations 2009 which came into effect on 23 November 2009.

References

External links

1988 in Scotland
United Kingdom Acts of Parliament 1988
Acts of the Parliament of the United Kingdom concerning England and Wales
Acts of the Parliament of the United Kingdom concerning Scotland
Scotch whisky
Alcohol law in the United Kingdom
Alcohol in Scotland